Ivica Pirić (born 24 January 1977, in Split) is a retired Croatian football player who last played for RNK Split.

Pirić is also a political activist. In 2018 he became a president and a co-owner of revived FC Arsenal-Kyiv.

Career
He is a persona non grata in Russia and is not allowed to enter that country. Pirić calls Ukraine his second homeland and in summer of 2015 organized humanitarian actions helping re-settlers from the eastern Ukraine, particularly children. With his help some 300 children from Ukraine had a chance to spend their summer in Omiš.

References

External links
 
Ivica Pirić at FootballDatabase.com

1977 births
Living people
Footballers from Split, Croatia
Association football midfielders
Croatian footballers
HNK Hajduk Split players
SSV Ulm 1846 players
NK Zagreb players
FC Arsenal Kyiv players
FC CSKA Kyiv players
HNK Trogir players
RNK Split players
Croatian Football League players
Ukrainian Premier League players
Croatian expatriate footballers
Expatriate footballers in Germany
Croatian expatriate sportspeople in Germany
Expatriate footballers in Ukraine
Croatian expatriate sportspeople in Ukraine
Ukrainian football chairmen and investors